Jovan Stefanović (Serbian Cyrillic: Јован Стефановић; born February 5, 1984) is a Serbian footballer who played as a midfielder.

External links
 Profile at Soccerway
 Profile at Playerhistory

1984 births
Living people
Serbian footballers
Association football midfielders
FK Obilić players
FK BASK players
FK Metalac Gornji Milanovac players
FK Hajduk Beograd players
Serbian expatriate footballers
Expatriate footballers in North Macedonia